Dato Paduka Haji Serbini bin Haji Ali (born April 10, 1955) is Brunei‘s ambassador to the United States of America.

Education 
Serbini earned a master's degree in law and diplomacy from The Fletcher School at Tufts University.

Diplomatic career 
Serbini started his diplomatic career at the Ministry of Foreign Affairs in 1980. Two years later, following his service at the Ministry of Foreign Affairs, he acted as second secretary in the High Commission in Singapore. After serving as first secretary at the Bangkok Embassy in 1984, he returned to Brunei as deputy director for protocol and consular affairs. In 1989, Serbini was appointed first secretary in Tokyo and returned home in 1992 to serve as deputy director of the Economic Affairs Department.
In 1996, following his appointment as director of Asian and Pacific Affairs, he moved to the ministry's policy division. The following year, he transferred to the Multilateral Economic Affairs Division. 

Serbini was appointed director of the Asia-Pacific Economic Cooperation Secretariat in 2000 after serving as its deputy director for a year. Later, as Brunei's permanent representative to the United Nations and ambassador to Colombia, he relocated to New York, and in 2002 he returned home to serve as deputy permanent secretary in the Ministry of Foreign Affairs. Two years later, he was appointed permanent secretary of the Ministry of Foreign Affairs, and in 2008 he served as permanent secretary of the Ministry of Interior. In the same year, he returned to diplomatic service as permanent representative to the European Union and ambassador to Belgium and Luxembourg.

Since 2016, Serbini has been the ambassador of Brunei to the United States of America.

Personal life 
Serbini is married with four children.

References 

1955 births
Living people
The Fletcher School at Tufts University alumni
Ambassadors of Brunei